Amathusia andamanensis, the Andaman palmking, is an endemic butterfly found in India that belongs to the Morphinae subfamily of the brush-footed butterflies family.

The Andaman palmking was earlier considered as a subspecies of the palmking (Amathusia phidippus andamanica, Frühstorfer).

Distribution
The Andaman palmking is found in the Andaman Islands of India.

Status
In 1932, William Harry Evans reported the butterfly as rare.

See also
List of butterflies of India
List of butterflies of India (Morphinae)
List of butterflies of India (Nymphalidae)

Notes

References

External links
Andaman and Nicobar Islands. Butterflies of conservation concern

Amathusia (butterfly)
Butterflies of Asia
Butterflies described in 1899
Taxa named by Hans Fruhstorfer